

Hermann Meyer-Rabingen (7 August 1887 – 21 February 1961) was a German general in the Wehrmacht during World War II. He was a recipient of the Knight's Cross of the Iron Cross.

He commanded the 197th Infantry Division beginning on 1 December 1939, initially serving in the rank of Generalmajor. On 1 November 1941, he was promoted to the rank of Generalleutnant. On 1 April 1942, he was replaced as commander of the 197th Division by Ehrenfried-Oskar Boege.

Meyer-Rabingen went on to be appointed commander of the 159th Infantry Division on 20 September 1942.

Awards and decorations

 Knight's Cross of the Iron Cross on 12 January 1942 as Generalleutnant and commander of 197. Infanterie-Division.

References

Citations

Bibliography

 

1887 births
1961 deaths
People from Rotenburg an der Wümme
People from the Province of Hanover
Lieutenant generals of the German Army (Wehrmacht)
German Army personnel of World War I
Recipients of the clasp to the Iron Cross, 1st class
Recipients of the Hanseatic Cross (Bremen)
Recipients of the Knight's Cross of the Iron Cross
Schutztruppe personnel
20th-century Freikorps personnel
Military personnel from Lower Saxony
German Army generals of World War II